was a lieutenant general in the Imperial Japanese Army and advisor to the government of the Republic of China, who later served as a politician in the House of Peers.

Life

Career
Banzai Rihachirō was born in Wakayama Prefecture, the eldest son of Artillery Captain Banzai Ryoichi. After graduating from the Army Youth School, he attended the Imperial Japanese Army Academy, from which he graduated in July 1891. In March 1892, Banzai was commissioned as an artillery lieutenant in the 6th Field Artillery Regiment. From February 1895 to March 1896, he served in the First Sino-Japanese War. He attended the Army Artillery School, graduating in November 1896, and then going on to the Army War College, from which he graduated from in December 1900, as the fourteenth in his class.

Banzai was assigned to the Imperial Japanese Army General Staff Office, and was sent on a mission to the Qing Empire and an investigation mission to Manchuria.  For a time, he served as an advisor to Chinese president Yuan Shikai. He returned to Japan in May 1908. He went on an official visit to Europe as a military attaché along with the 12th Field Artillery Regiment, the regiment leader of the 9th Field Artillery Regiment, and the IJA General Staff (residing in Beijing). He was promoted to the rank of major general in August 1917.

In 1921, Banzai was promoted to the rank of lieutenant general. In 1923, he was assigned as a military advisor to President of the Republic of China Li Yuanhong. In September 1934, he became an advisor to the Beijing Government. In April 1927, he retired from active service and entered the reserves. He served as a member of the House of Peers from April 18, 1927 to May 14, 1946.

Family
Banzai Rihachirō was the adoptive father of Ichirō Banzai, a lieutenant general in the Imperial Japanese Army. His brother Matahachi Banzai was an officer in the Imperial Japanese Navy, and his other brother Heihachi Banzai was a major general in the army.

Ranks, Awards, and Honors

Court ranks
Senior Eighth Rank, July 6, 1892
Senior Sixth Rank, December 27, 1907
Junior Third Rank, May 16, 1927

Orders (Empire of Japan)
Order of the Golden Kite (4th rank), 
Order of the Rising Sun (4th rank),
 Meiji 37-8 Military Medal of Honor, April 1, 1906
Order of the Sacred Treasure (3rd rank), May 16, 1914
Order of the Sacred Treasure (2nd rank), September 29, 1918
2600th Anniversary Celebration of the Japanese Empire Honorary Medal, November 10, 1940

Orders (Qing Empire)
Order of the Double Dragon (2nd rank), July 2, 1908

References

External links

1871 births
1950 deaths
Members of the House of Peers (Japan)
Japanese military personnel of the First Sino-Japanese War
Imperial Japanese Army Academy alumni
Recipients of the Order of the Rising Sun, 4th class
Recipients of the Order of the Sacred Treasure, 3rd class
Recipients of the Order of the Golden Kite
Japanese generals
People from Wakayama Prefecture